Kulp is a surname. Those bearing it include:

Bob Kulp, American businessman and politician
Charlie Kulp (1925–2021), United States airshow pilot
Claude L. Kulp (1894–1969), United States educator and Cornell University professor
Joshua Kulp (fl. 2000s), US-born Israeli Talmudic scholar and author
J. Laurence Kulp (1921–2006), United States geochemist
Marcus G. Kulp (born 1983), German singer and actor
Monroe Henry Kulp (1858–1911), United States politician
Nancy Kulp (1921–1991), United States film and television actress

See also
Culp